was a three-member Japanese idol group under the talent agency Johnny & Associates. They debuted on December 12, 1985. The group lead an annual musical Playzone from 1986 to 2008 for about 957 performances with a total attendance of over 1.38 million people over the course of 22 years.

On 20 September 2020 was announced the withdrawal of Nishikiori and Uekusa from the group on 31st December 2020 through the official website of the Johnny's Ent.

Members 
 . He has an official position in Johnny & Associates.
  The leader.
  Married with a son, who was in Johnny's Jr, and a daughter. It was announced on December 22, 2010 that Uekusa divorced in early December after more than sixteen years of marriage.

Appearances 
TV Dramas
 Monday Drama Land Munasawagi no Houkago (October 24, 1983; Fuji TV)
 Monday Drama Land Munasawagi no Houkago Part II (December 19, 1983; Fuji TV)
 Monday Drama Land Shonentai no Tadaima Houkago Special (June 4, 1984; Fuji TV)
 Monday Drama Land Show up ★ High School (March 4, 1985; Fuji TV)
 Yan Yan Utau Studio~5 Minute Drama Norainu Densetsu PART 1 (TV Tokyo)
 Yan Yan Utau Studio~5 Minute Drama Norainu Densetsu PART 2 (TV Tokyo)
 Kokoro wa Lonely Kimochi wa "..." V (March 1987; Fuji TV)
 Wataru Seken wa Oni Bakari Series (TBS) - Only Nishikiori and Uekusa, Higashiyama made a guest appearance
 Shonen Taiya~ Select Stage Atami Satsujin Jiken (October - November, 2001; Fuji TV)
 Shonen Taiya~ Select Stage Shibushi (November - December, 2001; Fuji TV) - Only Higashiyama and Uekusa

TV Shows
 The Young Best Ten (October 6, 1981 – 1982; TV Tokyo)
 Let's GO Idol (1982; TV Tokyo)
 Pinky Punch Daigyakuten (April - September, 1982; TBS)
 Parinko Gakuen No.1 (September 1982 - March 1983; TBS)
 The Hit Stage (April 1983 - March 1984; TBS)
 Namada! Omoshiro Tokkyubin (April - September, 1984; TBS)
 Sekai Marumie! TV Tokusoubu (April 1998–present; NTV) - Only Higashiyama and Uekusa
 Shonentime (October 1999 - March 2000; Fuji TV)
 Shonentime II (April 2000 - September 2000; Fuji TV)
 Shonentime III (October 2000 - March 2001; Fuji TV)
 Shonentaiya (April 2001 - December 2001; Fuji TV)

Film
 Munasawagi no Houkago (1982)
 Love Forever (1983)
 Aitsu to Lullaby (1983)
 19 Nineteen (1987)

Radio
 Jumping Johnny's Shonentai
 Live On! Johnny's Shonentai
 Live On! Shonentai
 Dakishimete! Shonentai
 Shukan Shonentai Magazine

Musical
 Musical Adventure The Sasuke/Hit Parade (April - May 1985)
 ShowGeki '92 MASK (May 1992)
 PLAYZONE MYSTERY (July 5–27, 1986; 30 performances)
 PLAYZONE '87 TIME-19 (July 3–26, 1987; 30 performances)
 PLAYZONE '88 Capriccio -Tenshi to Akuma no Kisokyoku- (July 4 - August 31, 1988; 51 performances)
 PLAYZONE '89 Again (July - August, 1989; 53 performances)
 PLAYZONE '90 MASK (July 7 - August 19, 1990; 42 performances)
 PLAYZONE '91 SHOCK (July - August, 1991; 41 performances)
 PLAYZONE '92 Saraba Diary (July 11 - August 16, 1992; 39 performances)
 PLAYZONE '93 WINDOW (July 8 - August 19, 1993; 41 performances)
 PLAYZONE '94 MOON (July 5 - August 12, 1994; 45 performances)
 PLAYZONE '95 KING&JOKER (July 7  - August 13, 1995; 40 performances)
 PLAYZONE '96 RYTHM (July - August, 1996; 38 performances)
 PLAYZONE '97 RYTHM II (July 12 - August 11, 1997; 35 performances)
 PLAYZONE '98 5nights (July 12 - August 17, 1998; 40 performances)
 PLAYZONE 1999 Goodbye&Hello (July 11 - August 15, 1999; 41 performances)
 PLAYZONE 2000 THEME PARK (July 16 - August 20, 2000; 40 performances)
 PLAYZONE 2001 EMOTION ~Shinseiki~ (July 14 - August 17, 2001; 44 performances)
 PLAYZONE 2002 Aishi (July 13 - August 15, 2002; 42 performances)
 PLAYZONE 2003 Vacation (July 14 - August 17, 2003; 40 performances)
 PLAYZONE 2004 WEST SIDE STORY (July 2 - August 16, 2004; 51 performances)
 PLAYZONE 2005 ~20th Anniversary~ Twenty Years...Soshite Mada Minu Miraie (July 6 - August 17, 2005; 44 performances)
 PLAYZONE 2006 Change (July 9 - August 5, 2006; 40 performances)
 PLAYZONE 2007 Change2Chance (July 7 - September 7, 2007; 40 performances)
 PLAYZONE 2008 Change 1986-2008 ~SHOW TIME Hit Series~ (July 6 - August 31, 2008; 45 performances)

Discography 
Singles
"Kamen Butokai" (Released: December 12, 1985)
"Dekamelon Densetsu" (Released: March 24, 1986)
"Diamond・Eyes" (Released: July 7, 1986)
"Ballad no youni Nemure" (Released: November 28, 1986)
"Stripe Blue" (Released: March 3, 1987)
"Kimidakeni" (Released: June 24, 1987)
"ABC" (Released: November 11, 1987)
"Lady" (Released: November 30, 1987)
"Futari" (Released: March 23, 1988)
"Silent Dancer" (Released: April 24, 1988)
"What's Your Name?" (Released: July 8, 1988)
"Jirettaine" (Released: November 10, 1988)
"Maittane Konya" (Released: June 19, 1989)
"Fuin Love" (Released: April 10, 1990)
"Funky Flushin'" (Released: July 7, 1990)
"Suna no Otoko" (Released: December 12, 1990)
"You're My Life -Utsukushi Hitoe-" (Released: April 29, 1993)
"Window" (Released: July 1993)
"Excuse" (Released: November 19, 1993)
"Oh!!" (Released: December 1, 1995)
"Wangan Skier" (Released: January 28, 1998)
"Ai to Chinmoku" (Released: August 26, 1998)
"Jōnetsu no Ichiya" (Released: June 23, 1999)
"Romantic Time" (Released: February 2, 2000)
"Kimi ga ita Koro" (Released: February 21, 2001)
"So Soh" (Released: July 9, 2006)

Albums
Backstage Pass (Released: March 8, 1986)
Sho Shonentai' (Released: September 1, 1986)Musical Plazon Mistery (Released: October 30, 1986)Duet (Released: November 28, 1986)Wonderland (Released: December 21, 1986)Private Life: Light & Shadow (Released: April 28, 1987)Time 19 (Released: July 1, 1987)Magical Dowa Tour (Released: September 25, 1987)Musical Time 19 (Released: October 28, 1987)Party (Released: December 14, 1987)Best of Shonentai (Released: March 10, 1988)Capriccio: Tenshi to Akuma no Kasōkyoku (Released: June 10, 1988)Shonentai Musical Playzone '89 Again (Released: September 21, 1989)Shonentai Musical Playzone '90 Mask (Released: June 30, 1990)Heart to Heart 5years Shonentai... Soshite 1991 (Released: December 23, 1990)Ai wa Tsudukeru Koto ni Imi ga Aru (Released: December 1, 1993)Shonentai Musical Playzone'94 Moon (Released: June 17, 1994)Shonentai Musical Playzone'96 Rhythm (Released: July 10, 1996)Shonentai Musical Playzone'97 Rhythm 2 (Released: July 21, 1997)Shonentai Musical Playzone'98 5nights (Released: August 5, 1998)Prism (Released: January 27, 1999)Shonentai Musical Playzone'99 Good bye & Hello (Released: July 7, 1999)Shonentai Musical Playzone2000 Theme Park (Released: August 2, 2000)Shonentai Musical Playzone2001 Shinseiki Emotion (Released: August 1, 2001)Shonentai Musical Playzone2002 Ai Shi (Released: July 31, 2002)Shonentai Musical Playzone2003 Vacation (Released: August 6, 2003)Shonentai Musical Playzone2005 20th Anniversary: Twenty Years… Soshite Mada Minu Mirai e (Released: August 10, 2005)Shonentai Musical Playzone2006 Change (Released: July 26, 2006)Shonentai Musical Playzone2007 Change 2 Chance: First Act (Released: September 5, 2007)Shonentai 35th Anniversary Best'' (Released: December 12, 2020)

References

Japanese boy bands
Japanese idol groups
Johnny & Associates
Japanese pop music groups
Musical groups established in 1985
1985 establishments in Japan